The Simav or Susurluk River (Susurluk Çayı) is a river in Anatolian Turkey. Its course is 321 km long and its basin comprises 22 400 km2. It was the classical Macestus (Mékestos). In the 19th century, it was known as the Mikalick.

The Simav has its source in Kütahya Province, from which it flows north across the plain of Simav into Balıkesir Province. There is a reservoir at the Çaygören Dam, out of which the Simav flows past Susurluk and meets the Adirnaz. During the classical period, the Macestus was a tributary of the Rhyndacus (the modern Adirnaz), but today the Simav forms the main course from their confluence near Karacabey down to the Sea of Marmara. Along the way, it meets the Nilüfer River (the classical Odrysses).

Its mouth faces the island of Imrali, a high-security prison.

References

External links
 A map of the Simav Basin (tr)

Rivers of Turkey
Landforms of Kütahya Province
Landforms of Balıkesir Province
Landforms of Bursa Province